The flag of Taymyr Autonomous Okrug, in the Russian Federation, is a light blue field charged in the center with a white disc (surrounded by four rays at the cardinal positions), which is one half of the flag in width. The disc, in turn, is charged with a Red-breasted Goose in the center.

The flag was authorized on 23 June 2000, prior to the okrug's merge to Krasnoyarsk Krai on January 1, 2007.  Its proportions were 2:3.

References

External links
Flags of the World

Flag
Flags of the federal subjects of Russia
Taymyr
Taymyr
Taymyr
Taymyr